Paavo Daavid "Pate" Berg (23 November 1911, in Lahti – 1 November 1941, in Hanko) was a Finnish fighter ace. He was the second most successful Finnish biplane fighter ace, scoring 10.5 victories (5 while flying Gloster Gladiators). The remaining 4.5 victories were with Curtiss Hawk 75s. He was shot down and killed by anti-aircraft fire on 1 November 1941.

Berg was accepted into the Cadet School in June 1931. He was promoted to lieutenant in 1935 and captain in 1940.

Victories

References

 Keskinen, Kalevi; Stenman, Kari and Niska, Klaus. Hävittäjä-ässät (Finnish Fighter Aces). Espoo, Finland: Tietoteas, 1978. . (Finnish)
 Stenman, Kari and Keskinen, Kalevi. Finnish Aces of World War 2 (Aircraft of the Aces 23). Oxford, UK: Osprey Publishing, 1998. .

Finnish Air Force personnel
Finnish military personnel killed in World War II
Finnish World War II flying aces
1911 births
1941 deaths
Aviators killed by being shot down